Ysbyty Cynfyn is a hamlet in the  community of Blaenrheidol, Ceredigion, Wales, which is 69.1 miles (111.3 km) from Cardiff and 169.3 miles (272.4 km) from London.

The Parish Church of St John the Baptist was built in the early 19th century, replacing a previous one. The oldest gravestone dates from 1793 and first recorded quadruplet babies were buried in the churchyard in 1856.

References

See also
List of localities in Wales by population

Villages in Ceredigion